Ali Al-Hayari (1923-2002) was a Jordanian general that held the post of Chairman of the Joint Chiefs of Staff of the Jordanian Armed Forces from 17 April 1957	to 20 April 1957.

References

1923 births
2002 deaths
Jordanian generals